The 2002–03 season was the 106th season of competitive football in Scotland.

League competitions

Scottish Premier League

The 2002–03 Scottish Premier League was won on goal difference by Rangers by a single goal over Celtic. Both Rangers and Celtic qualified for the 2003–04 UEFA Champions League and Hearts got the UEFA Europa League place. Motherwell finished bottom, but there was no relegation from the SPL as Falkirk did not meet SPL stadium criteria. Celtic's trophyless season was in spite of being favourites to clinch the title and reaching the UEFA Cup final, losing in extra time to F.C. Porto.

Note: There was no relegation from the Scottish Premier League.

Scottish First Division

Note: There was no promotion from the Scottish First Division.

Scottish Second Division

Scottish Third Division

Other honours

Cup honours

Individual honours

SPFA awards

SFWA awards

Scottish clubs in Europe

Summary

Average coefficient – 7.375

Celtic

Rangers

Livingston

Aberdeen

Scotland national team

Key:
 (H) = Home match
 (A) = Away match
 ECQG5 = European Championship Qualifying – Group 5

Notes and references

 
Seasons in Scottish football

no:Skotsk Premier League 2002–2003